The Bibliothèque-Musée de l'Opéra National de Paris is a library and museum of the Paris Opera and is located in the 9th arrondissement at 8 rue Scribe, Paris, France. It is no longer managed by the Opera, but instead is part of the Music Department of the National Library of France (Bibliothèque nationale de France or BnF). The Paris Opera Library-Museum is open daily; an admission fee is charged.

Emperor's Pavilion
The Library-Museum is housed in the Palais Garnier in the Rotonde de l'Empereur, a pavilion on the west side of the theatre, which was originally designed to be the private entrance for Emperor Napoleon III. Thus, the Emperor's could directly enter in the building and avoid any assassination attempt. The library is located near the intersection of the rue Scribe with the rue Auber, streets which are named after the librettist Eugène Scribe and the composer Daniel Auber, both of whom had works performed by the Paris Opera.

After the Emperor's death in 1873 and the proclamation of the French Third Republic in 1870, President Mac-Mahon refused to use this Pavilion as a private space for the head of state. Charles Nutters succeeded in compelling Charles Garnier to transform the pavilion into a space for the conservation of the Opera's books and archives.

The archives and the library
From the time of the creation of the Paris Opera in 1669 until the middle of the 19th century there was no official entity in charge of the preservation and management of archival materials produced by the activities of the Opera and its associated theatre. The creation of an archives service and a library was integrated into the project entrusted to the architect Charles Garnier for the construction of a new opera house to replace the Opera's former theatre, the Salle Le Peletier. Thus the current Paris Opera Library-Museum traces its origin to two former services of the Opera, the archives and the library, each created in 1866. At that time, the Opera director became an entrepreneur. Expenses exceeded the receipts, and the government needed a strong man to run the establishment but was afraid that the archives would be sold to generate money.

Around 1863 Charles Nuitter had begun cataloging the Opera's archives, and on 15 May 1866, he became the official archivist. He also published several books on the history of the company. Théodore Lajarte was appointed librarian in 1873 and embarked on the systematic organization of the Opera's scores and instrumental parts. In 1876 he first published his two-volume inventory of the library's holdings covering the period from 1671 to 1876.

The archives and the library were soon merged, and in 1881 augmented with a museum open to the public. In 1899, Nuitter was succeeded by his assistant Charles Malherbe. At first, the Opera Library-Museum was attached to the State Secretariat of the Fine Arts (Secrétariat d'État aux Beaux-Arts), but in 1935, it became part of the National Library and in 1942 became a part of the newly established National Library's Music Department.

The rooms of the library provide a comfortable environment for work and study, and the staff is knowledgeable and helpful. Much of the library is little changed from its original appearance in the 19th century. Access to the library may be difficult at times (the entrance is through the main foyer of the opera house), and it is advisable to call ahead to confirm the hours when it is open.

Today, the Library conserves around 600,000 documents related to the history of the Opéra and the Opéra-Comique, including about 100,000 books, 250,000 autograph letters, 16,000 scores, 30,000 libretti, 100,000 photographs, and 30,000 prints.

The museum

The modern museum has five rooms which display three centuries of the Paris Opera's history through paintings, costumes, drawings of scenery, and scale models of set designs. Altogether, the museum conserves 8 500 objects.

At the top of the stairs which lead to the museum is a bronze by the sculptor  which depicts the dancer Alexandre Kalioujny in mid-leap during a performance of Michel Fokine's ballet  which is based on the Polovtsian Dances of Borodin's Prince Igor.

Visitors are also able to see shelves of books and scores, which are protected by grilles. These materials include fifteen thousand scores and thirty thousand librettos and are accessible to the public on days when the museum is not open for tours. The museum's collections are too extensive to be displayed all at one time, as they consist of approximately 8,500 objects, including 2,500 models of sets, 500 set design drawings, and 3,000 pieces of costume jewelry.

The Library-Museum has organized more than 25 exhibitions since 1992, in collaboration with the BnF and others. Some of the items in the collection have also been displayed at the Musée d'Orsay.

See also 
 List of museums in Paris
 List of music museums
 Palais Garnier
 Bibliothèque nationale de France

Notes

Bibliography
 Cooper, Jeffrey (1992). "Nuitter [Truinet], Charles-Louis-Etienne" in Sadie 1992, vol. 3, pp. 635–636. Also at Oxford Music Online (subscription required).
 Gressel, Valérie (2002). Charles Nuitter : des scènes parisiennes à la Bibliothèque de l'Opéra. Hildesheim, New York: Olms. .
 Huebner, Steven (1992). "Lajarte, Théodore (Edouard Dufaure de)" in Sadie 1992, vol. 2, p. 1081. Also available at Oxford Music Online (subscription required).
 Lajarte, Théodore de (1878). Bibliothèque musicale du Théâtre de l'Opéra, volume 1 [1671–1791]. Paris: Librairie des Bibliophiles. View at Google Books.
 Lajarte, Théodore de (1878). Bibliothèque musicale du Théâtre de l'Opéra, volume 2 [1793–1876]. Paris: Librairie des Bibliophiles. View at Google Books.
 Lebeau, Elisabeth (2001). "Malherbe, Charles (Théodore)" in Sadie 2001. Also available at Oxford Music Online (subscription required).
 Nuitter, Charles (1875). Le nouvel Opéra (with 59 engravings). Paris: Hachette. Copies 1, 2, and 3 at Google Books.
 Nuitter, Charles (1878). Histoire et description du nouvel Opéra. Paris: Plon. View at Gallica.
 Nuitter, Charles; Thoinan, Ernest (1886). Les origines de l'Opéra français (in French). Paris: E. Plon, Nourrit et Cie. Copies 1 and 2 at Google Books.
 Sadie, Stanley, editor (1992). The New Grove Dictionary of Opera (4 volumes). London: Macmillan. .
 Sadie, Stanley (2001). The New Grove Dictionary of Music and Musicians, 2nd edition. London: Macmillan.  (hardcover).  (eBook).
 Simeone, Nigel (2000). Paris – A Musical Gazetteer. New Haven: Yale University Press. .

External links
 Website at the BnF
 
 Planetware description
Virtual tour of the Bibliothèque-Musée de l'Opéra National de Paris provided by Google Arts & Culture

Opera national de paris, Bibliothequemusee
Opera museums

Opera history
Buildings and structures in the 9th arrondissement of Paris
Libraries in Paris
Music museums in France
Opera in Paris